The 2016 European Champions Cup was a European baseball competition, held from May 31, to June 4, 2016. This was the fifty-forth iteration of the Cup since its inaugural tournament in 1963. The champions were Dutch team L&D Amsterdam, winning the team's first title.

List of competing teams

Venues

First round

Group A 

|}

Group B 

|}

Final four
Semi-Final 1

Semi-Final 2

3rd Place

Grand Final

Bottom Four 
Game 1

Game 2

Relegation Game

Final standings

* Both teams share 5th place.

Statistics leaders

Batting

Pitching

See also 
 European Baseball Championship
 Asia Series
 Caribbean Series
 Baseball awards#Europe

References 

European Cup (baseball)
International baseball competitions in Europe
2016 in baseball